Pleasant Valley School may refer to:

Pleasant Valley School (Bellvue, Colorado), listed on the NRHP in Colorado
Pleasant Valley School (Branson, Colorado), listed on the NRHP in Colorado
Pleasant Valley School (Kimberly, Idaho), listed on the NRHP in Idaho
Pleasant Valley School (Stillwater, Oklahoma), listed on the NRHP in Oklahoma
Pleasant Valley School District No. 2 (Wellsville, Kansas), listed on the NRHP in Kansas